Pierstown is a hamlet located on CR-28 north of Cooperstown and west of Five Mile Point in the Town of Otsego, in Otsego County, New York, United States.

Pierstown Grange No. 793 is located here and is one of three remaining in Otsego County. It is a contributing building to the Glimmerglass Historic District.

History
Soon after Pierstown was formed, mills were built on Leatherstocking Creek, the water eventually flows over Leatherstocking Falls, was used to generate power. At one point there were three sawmills, three gristmills and a carding machine in operation. There were also at different times five taverns, three stores, two tanneries, four blacksmith shops, a pottery, a brewery, a wagon shop, a lead pipe factory and several weaver shops.

By 1886 all that remained of the businesses was a blacksmith shop. Pierstown was becoming more of an agricultural zone. But like any other area in upstate New York, farming declined in the last quarter of the 20th century.

Pierstown was named after the Pīer family, who were among the earliest settlers in what was called the Great Barrington Purchase and arrived c. 1786. There were six brothers in the family, who occupied what was called the Brick House Farm. One brother kept a tavern. Another brother, Abner, was in the Revolutionary War and during the famous Cherry Valley Massacre, Abner was tomahawked by an American Indian, scalped and twice wounded, but lived.

References

Hamlets in Otsego County, New York
Hamlets in New York (state)